Václav Wasserman (19 February 1898 – 28 January 1967) was a Czechoslovak screenwriter, film actor and director. He wrote for 91 films between 1920 and 1958.

Selected filmography

 From the Czech Mills (1925)
 The May Fairy (1926)
 The Organist at St. Vitus' Cathedral (1929)
 Sin of a Beautiful Woman (1929)
 Imperial and Royal Field Marshal (1930)
 Fairground People (1930)
 Him and His Sister (1931)
 Business Under Distress (1931)
 The Last Bohemian (1931)
 Sister Angelika (1932)
 His Majesty's Adjutant (1932)
 The Undertaker (1932)
 Wehe, wenn er losgelassen (1932)
 The Ideal Schoolmaster (1932)
 Public Not Admitted (1933)
 Pobočník Jeho Výsosti (1933)
 The Ruined Shopkeeper (1933)
 Workers, Let's Go (1934)
 Poslední muž (1934)
 The Seamstress (1936)
 Father Vojtech (1936)
 Lidé na kře (1937)
 Lawyer Vera (1937)
 Tři vejce do skla (1937)
 A Girl from the Chorus (1937)
 Škola základ života (1938)
 Ducháček Will Fix It (1938)
 Jiný vzduch (1939)
 The Catacombs (1940)
 Baron Prášil (1940)
 The Blue Star Hotel (1941)
 Saturday (1945)

References

External links
 

1898 births
1967 deaths
Czech screenwriters
Male screenwriters
Czech male film actors
Czech film directors
Male actors from Prague
20th-century screenwriters